Håland is a former municipality in Rogaland county, Norway.  It was part of the traditional district of Jæren, just west of the city of Stavanger.  The municipality existed from 1838 until its dissolution in 1930 when it was split into the two municipalities of Sola and Madla.  The  municipality included the land surrounding the Hafrsfjorden including all of the present-day municipality of Sola and the borough of Madla in the city of Stavanger.

History
The historic parish of Haaland (later spelled Håland) included churches located in Sola, Tananger, Tjora, and Madla. On 1 January 1838, the parish of Haaland was established as a municipality (see formannskapsdistrikt law). Håland municipality existed until 1930, when it was split to form the two new municipalities of Madla (population: 1,091) and Sola (population: 3,372).  Later, Madla was merged with the city of Stavanger and it now makes up the borough of Madla.

See also
List of former municipalities of Norway

References

Stavanger
Sola, Norway
Former municipalities of Norway
1838 establishments in Norway
1930 disestablishments in Norway